Champalimaud may refer to:

António Champalimaud
José Joaquim Champalimaud
Champalimaud Foundation